SC Whitmore School in South Carolina is a virtual school that is authorized by the South Carolina Public Charter School District, an extension of the South Carolina Department of Education. Opened in August 2011, it offers free public school that high school students in grades 9-12 attend from home. The school operates year-round without semesters.

Coursework is self-paced and based upon mastery learning. Students work with certified teachers in self-paced, asynchronous classes to revise their assignments until they have demonstrated mastery.

The SC Whitmore School is accredited by the  AdvancED Accreditation Commission.

Administration
The current Executive Director of SC Whitmore School is Kim Dunbar.

See also
List of virtual schools
South Carolina Public Charter School District

References

External links
SC Whitmore School website
AdvancED Accreditation Commission

Private high schools in South Carolina